Wouter ter Maat (born 7 May 1991) is a Dutch professional volleyball player. He is a member of the Netherlands national team. At the professional club level, he plays for Ziraat Bankası Ankara.

Honours

Clubs
 CEV Challenge Cup
  2020/2021 – with Ziraat Bankası Ankara

 National championships
 2014/2015  Dutch Cup, with VC Zwolle
 2014/2015  Dutch Championship, with VC Zwolle
 2016/2017  German Championship, with Berlin Recycling Volleys
 2018/2019  Turkish Cup, with Fenerbahçe İstanbul
 2018/2019  Turkish Championship, with Fenerbahçe İstanbul
 2020/2021  Turkish Championship, with Ziraat Bankası Ankara
 2021/2022  Turkish SuperCup, with Ziraat Bankası Ankara
 2021/2022  Turkish Championship, with Ziraat Bankası Ankara
 2022/2023  Turkish SuperCup, with Ziraat Bankası Ankara

References

External links
 
 Player profile at Volleybox.net 

1991 births
Living people
People from Rijssen
Sportspeople from Overijssel
Dutch men's volleyball players
Dutch expatriate sportspeople in Belgium
Expatriate volleyball players in Belgium
Dutch expatriate sportspeople in Germany
Expatriate volleyball players in Germany
Dutch expatriate sportspeople in France
Expatriate volleyball players in France
Dutch expatriate sportspeople in Turkey
Expatriate volleyball players in Turkey
Paris Volley players
Fenerbahçe volleyballers
Ziraat Bankası volleyball players
Opposite hitters